Kenneth Hansen may refer to:

 Kenneth Hansen (speedway rider) (born 1987), Danish motorcycle speedway rider
 Kenneth Hansen (cyclist) (born 1991), Danish cyclo-cross cyclist
 Kenneth Hansen (rallycross) (born 1960), Swedish rallycross driver

See also
 Ken Hansen (born 1951), member of the Montana Senate
 Kenn Hansen (born 1980), Danish football referee